Robert Coleby (born 1947) is a British actor who has spent most of his career in Australia. Active since the 1970s, he has over 70 film and television credits to his name. Coleby has acted on stage in numerous productions for the Queensland Theatre Company in Brisbane.

Early life
In his late teens, Robert lived in Edington, Somerset and went to Dr Morgan's School in Bridgwater. At that time he was influenced by the beat generation, novelist Jack Kerouac and singer/songwriter Bob Dylan and performed with acoustic guitar at folk music clubs in Bridgwater and Taunton. He enjoyed hitch-hiking in Europe during the school holidays, and worked in the peat fields near Shapwick to fund his travels.

Early career
Coleby's real name is Robert Taylor. Since there was already a famous actor of that name, Equity rules required that he choose another.

Coleby's earliest screen role was in 1970, playing the role of Fortinbras in a TV version of Hamlet in the long-running US series Hallmark Hall of Fame, followed by a role as a hitchhiker in the 1971 US motion picture The Last Run which starred George C. Scott. During the next several years, he appeared in a number of TV productions in the UK, including five episodes of the 1973 children's series Pollyanna. Moving to Sydney, Australia in 1975, he made his debut on Australian TV appearing in an episode of the TV period drama Rush in 1976. Over the next two decades, Coleby became a regular face on Australian TV; he was a cast regular on several TV series including the roles; Dr Barrett in The Young Doctors in 1977; pilot Barry Drummond on Chopper Squad (1977–79); RAN officer Lt Fisher in Patrol Boat (1979–83); Reverend Lonsdale in the mini-series Anzacs (1985); and, businessman Tom Barsby in the short-lived soap opera, Paradise Beach (1993–94).

Later career
Coleby played Richard Craig in several episodes of the Australian medical drama All Saints between 1998 and 2004, and appeared as William Maplewhite in two episodes of The Lost World in 2001 and 2002. In 2005 he portrayed Rock Hudson in the fictionalised American television movie/docudrama Dynasty: The Making of a Guilty Pleasure, based on the creation and behind the scenes production of the 1980s prime time soap opera Dynasty. Coleby played Alexander Preston in the 2006 American telenovela Monarch Cove, and Howard Webb in a 2006 episode of the Australian drama McLeod's Daughters. He later played Paul Devers in the 2007 American miniseries The Starter Wife.

In 2009 Coleby appeared as "Urquart" in two episodes of the British television series Heartbeat ("Thursday's Children" and "The Middle of Somewhere") both of which were set in Australia.

More recent theatre work includes the title role in the Queensland Theatre Company's 2007 production of the Henrik Ibsen play John Gabriel Borkman. In 2011, Coleby appeared in an episode of Terra Nova, titled "Proof", as Professor Ken Horton. He also appeared in WWE Studios The Marine 2, which was inspired by the 2001 Dos Palmas kidnappings.

Personal life
Coleby is married to Lena Coleby; their children are Australian actors Anja Coleby and Conrad Coleby.

Filmography

Film

Television

References

External links
 

1947 births
Living people
Actors from Ipswich
English male film actors
English male stage actors
English male television actors
English emigrants to Australia
Date of birth missing (living people)
20th-century English male actors
21st-century English male actors